HMS Spiteful (Pennant number P227) was a third-batch S-class submarine built for the Royal Navy during the Second World War.

Design and description

The S-class submarines were designed to patrol the restricted waters of the North Sea and the Mediterranean Sea. The third batch was slightly enlarged and improved over the preceding second batch of the S-class. They displaced  on the surface and  submerged. The S-class submarines had a crew of 48 officers and ratings.

For surface running, the boats were powered by two  diesel engines, each driving one propeller shaft. When submerged each propeller was driven by a  electric motor. They could reach  on the surface and  underwater.

The boats were armed with seven 21-inch (533 mm) torpedo tubes. A half-dozen of these were in the bow and there was one external tube in the stern. They carried six reload torpedoes for the bow tubes for a total of thirteen torpedoes. Twelve mines could be carried in lieu of the internally stowed torpedoes. They were also armed with a 3-inch (76 mm) deck gun. It is uncertain if Spiteful was completed with a  Oerlikon light AA gun or had one added later. The third-batch S-class boats were fitted with either a Type 129AR or 138 ASDIC system and a Type 291 or 291W early-warning radar.

Career
She sailed for Ceylon, arriving in April 1944. She was assigned to 8th Flotilla, . She made two patrols, then transited to Fremantle.  She sunk a number of Japanese vessels with gunfire, on 30 June, 2 July and 14 December.

French service

Notes

References

External links
 

1943 ships
British S-class submarines (1931)
Saphir-class submarines (1951)
ships built on the River Clyde
World War II submarines of the United Kingdom